Strausberg Stadt is a railway station in the city of Strausberg in Brandenburg. Located on the Strausberg–Strausberg Nord line, it is served by the S-Bahn line .

History
Strausberg Stadt station exists since the track opening. The station has a track on an uncovered side platform, which is accessible at ground level barrier-free. Originally, instead of the side platform, an island platform between two tracks was planned. However, this was not implemented as the planned double-track line was not realized.

The reception building is a small low-rise building. The city intends to acquire the station building for around 25,000 euros, in order to subsequently remodel the area and the connection to the historic old town of Strausberg.

Notable places nearby
Straussee
Strausberg Airfield

See also
Strausberg Railway
Straussee Ferry
Strausberg station
Strausberg Hegermühle station
Strausberg Nord station

References

External links

Stadt
Stadt
Berlin S-Bahn stations
Railway stations in Brandenburg
Buildings and structures in Märkisch-Oderland
Railway stations in Germany opened in 1956